

The Chadwick C-122 was a single-seat ultralight helicopter developed in the United States in the 1980s. It was a minimalist design consisting of a fibreglass shell enclosing a truss structure to which the engine, rotor mast, landing gear, and pilot's seat were attached. A wide variety of roles were envisaged for the aircraft, and therefore it was equipped with attachment points for spray bars, a cargo hook, external cargo racks, and even weapons for law enforcement work. The skid-type undercarriage could be quickly fitted with wheels for ground-handling, or floats for operations from water.

A prototype was constructed in 1985, and publicly unveiled at the Helicopter Association International annual convention the following year. Flight testing continued through 1987, with deliveries anticipated for that Autumn.

Variants proposed
 C-122S - basic single-seat utility version
 C-122T - two-seat version
 C-122AG - agricultural version
 C-122PI - "Police interceptor" version
 C-122R - RPV version
 C-122W - armed ("weapons") version

A tethered helicopter training platform based on the C-122 was also proposed

Specifications (C-122S)

References
 
 

1980s United States civil utility aircraft
1980s United States helicopters
Aircraft first flown in 1985